Babes may refer to:


Arts and entertainment
 Babes (band), an American indie pop band
 "Babes", a song from the album The Inner Me by Lala Hsu
 Babes (TV series), an American sitcom (1990–1991)
 Babes (website), a pornographic website

People
 Babes Wodumo (born 1994), South African singer and choreographer
 Mohamed Seghir Babes (1943–2017), Algerian politician

Sports teams
 Osun Babes F.C., a football club based in Osogbo, Osun State, Nigeria
 Springfield Babes, an American soccer club (1926–1927)

See also
 Babeș (disambiguation)
 Babes in Toyland (disambiguation)
 Babes in the Wood (disambiguation)
 Babe (disambiguation)
 
 Babies (disambiguation)